Parmelia imbricaria is a species of foliose lichen in the family Parmeliaceae. Found in western Canada, it was formally described as a new species in 2017 by Trevor Goward, Pradeep Kumar Divakar, María del Carmen Molina, and Ana Crespo. The type specimen was collected by Goward near the Clearwater River drainage (British Columbia, Canada), where it was found at an altitude of  growing on a basalt boulder. The specific epithet refers to the "imbricate" (closely overlapping) lobes of the thallus. The lichen occurs in western Canada, with a range including southern Yukon and extending south to southern inland British Columbia. The European Parmelia pinatifida is a closely related species.

References

imbricaria
Lichen species
Lichens described in 2017
Lichens of Western Canada
Taxa named by Ana Crespo
Taxa named by Pradeep Kumar Divakar
Fungi without expected TNC conservation status